Spring Point Ledge Light is a sparkplug lighthouse in South Portland, Maine, that marks a dangerous obstruction on the west side of the main shipping channel into Portland Harbor. It is now adjacent to the campus of Southern Maine Community College.

History
The lighthouse was constructed in 1897 by the government after seven steamship companies stated that many of their vessels ran aground on Spring Point Ledge.  Congress initially allocated $20,000 to its construction, although the total cost of the tower ended up being $45,000 due to problems with storms and poor quality cement.  The lighthouse featured a fog bell that sounded twice every 12 seconds, and a lantern fitted with a fifth order Fresnel lens first lit by Keeper William A. Lane on May 24, 1897.

Improvements were made to the lighthouse throughout the 20th century. The lighthouse was originally owned and operated by the United States Coast Guard. However, on April 28, 1998, the Maine Lights Selection Committee approved a transfer of ownership  of the tower to the Spring Point Ledge Light Trust, with the USCG retaining only the light and fog signal. On May 22, 1999, Spring Point Ledge Light was opened to the public for the first time in its history. It is a popular spot on any summer day for families to picnic and boat-watch on the breakwater or for fishermen to spend an afternoon catching fish. Adjacent to the lighthouse, visitors may also tour the old Fort Preble, the Southern Maine Community College Campus, and visit a small gift shop.

It was added to the National Register of Historic Places as Spring Point Ledge Light Station on January 21, 1988.

Gallery

See also
National Register of Historic Places listings in Cumberland County, Maine

References

External links

Spring Point Ledge Light Trust

Lighthouses completed in 1897
Lighthouses on the National Register of Historic Places in Maine
Buildings and structures in South Portland, Maine
Lighthouses in Cumberland County, Maine
Southern Maine Community College
National Register of Historic Places in Cumberland County, Maine